My Brother's Keeper is the fifth studio album by American contemporary R&B group K-Ci & JoJo, released on September 30, 2013.

Singles
"Knock It Off" was released on June 11, 2013.

Track listing

Credits 
Adapted from Allmusic and album liner.

Cedric "K-Ci" Hailey 	— Primary Artist
Joel "JoJo" Hailey 	— Primary Artist
Damon Jones	— Executive Producer
Roger "Mista Raja" Greene	— Composer, Executive Producer, Producer
Logan Alexander	— Photography
Yusef "Sef Millz" Alexander	— Composer, Producer
David Alford	— Composer, Producer
Sherrod Barnes	— Bass, Guitar
Michael Bell	— Composer
Danielle Brimm	 — A&R, Producer
Devon L. Bryce	— Composer
C-Ray	— Composer, Producer
Trevin "Big Trev" Clark	— Composer, Producer
Bekah Connolly  — A&R
Shawnte Crespo	— Product Manager
Cylla	— Programming
James Earl Davis	— Composer
Eric Fernandez		— Engineer, Producer
Paul Grosso	— Creative Director
Phelippe Herrera	— Composer
Paul Irvin	— Composer
Eric Jackson	— Composer

Earl R. Johnson, Jr.	— Composer, Producer
Jordan Lewis	— Additional Production, Composer, Keyboards
Sean Marlowe	— Art Direction, Design
Carlett Martin	— Composer
Giovanna Melchiorre	— Publicity
Arnold Mischkulnig	— Mastering, Mixing
Debra Mitchell-Adams	— Composer
Jerome Perkins		— Composer
Preach	 — Engineer
Serlatheo Quinlan		— Composer, Producer
Dalton "D Smitty" Smith		— Composer, Producer
Mike Smoov		— Composer
Willie Stephens		— Composer
Hanif Sumner		— Publicity
P.L. Sweets		— Producer
Ayinde Thomas	— Composer, Producer
Dontay Thompson	— Promoter
Prentiss Thompson	— Composer
Corey Tunnessen	— Engineer, Mixing
Maurice White		— Promoter
Marc Williams		— Composer, Engineer, Producer, Vocal Producer

Weekly charts

References 

2013 albums
K-Ci & JoJo albums